John Stewart Settlement House, also known as the Stewart House , was a historic settlement house located at Gary, Indiana. It was built in 1925, and was a -story, "U"-shaped, Tudor Revival style brick and stucco building. It has been demolished.

It was listed in the National Register of Historic Places in 1977 and delisted in 1992.

References

Former National Register of Historic Places in Indiana
Houses on the National Register of Historic Places in Indiana
Tudor Revival architecture in Indiana
Houses completed in 1925
National Register of Historic Places in Gary, Indiana
Settlement houses in the United States